Social Intercourse may refer:
Social Intercourse (Smashed Gladys album)
Social Intercourse (Stephen Pearcy album)